COLCAP is the main stock market index of the Colombia Stock Exchange since November 2013 when it replaced IGBC as the leading index for Colombia. It consists of the 20 most actively traded shares of the market. The adjusted market capitalization for each company listed on the COLCAP is reviewed periodically to determine its inclusion in the index.

The COLCAP index was inaugurated on January 5, 2008 with an initial value of 1,000.

Components
The COLCAP Index consists of the following 20 major Colombian companies:

See also
 Colombia Stock Exchange
 IGBC

References

External links 
 Bloomberg page for COLCAP:IND
 COLCAP Index

Finance in Colombia
South American stock market indices